Shantavothie (Shanthie) Naidoo (born in Pretoria, South Africa, 6 March 1935) is South African anti-Apartheid activist and an early African National Congress (ANC) member. She was placed in solitary confinement for her political activism along with Winnie Mandela. After leaving South Africa, she continued her political activism on behalf of ANC from  Britain.

References

South African people of Tamil descent
Living people
South African politicians of Indian descent
1935 births